Our Saviour Institute of Science, Agriculture and Technology (OSISATECH) is a privately owned polytechnic in Enugu, Enugu State, Nigeria established in 1989.

History 
It was founded by the Catholic priest Rev. Fr. Prof. Emmanuel Edeh, who also founded secondary schools and the Madonna University, Okija Campus, Elele Campus, Enugu Campus, Anambra State; Caritas University, Amorji-Nike, Enugu.
The institution was one of the few privately owned schools to take advantage of a 1993 decree that spelled out criteria for official recognition of private universities, polytechnics and colleges of education, during a window when the government was issuing approvals.

In a ranking by the National Commission for Colleges of Education of performance in the 1999/2000 academic year of 75 federal, state and privately owned colleges, the institute was at the foot of the list. In November 2012, OSISATECH College of Education received an award for Teachers Development in Nigeria. It was given by NCCE. In December 2009, Emmanuel Edeh was honoured with the African Film Festival and Academy Award in London.

Courses 
The institution offers the following courses;

 Accountancy
 Banking and Finance
 Biology/Chemistry
 Biology/Integrated Science
Biology/Mathematics
Biology/Physics
Business Administration and Management
Business Education
Geography/Chemistry
Christian Religious Knowledge Studies/English
Christian Religious Knowledge Studies/Social Studies
Computer Education/Chemistry
Computer Education/Physics
Computer Engineering
Computer Science
Computer Science/Biology
Computer Science/Economics
Computer Science Education/Mathematics
Cooperative Economics and Management
Electrical/Electronic Engineering
Electrical/Electronic Engineering Technology
English
English/Geography
English/Social Studies
Fine and Applied Arts
Food Technology
Home Economics
Insurance
Mass Communication
Mathematics/Physics
Office Technology/Management
Primary Education Studies
Public Administration
Science Laboratory Technology
Technical Education
Physical and Health Education

See also
 List of polytechnics in Nigeria

References

Christian universities and colleges in Nigeria
Enugu
Buildings and structures in Enugu State
Technological universities in Nigeria
Educational institutions established in 1989
1989 establishments in Nigeria